MMRDA Mumbai Monorail is a monorail system in the city of Mumbai, Maharashtra, India, built as part of a major expansion of public transport in the city. The project was implemented and is currently operated by the Mumbai Metropolitan Region Development Authority (MMRDA). It is the first monorail in India since the Kundala Valley Railway and Patiala State Monorail Trainways were closed in the 1920s.This runs from Chembur to Sant Ghadge Maharaj Chowk connecting Harbour, Central and Western line.  The system started commercial operation after partially opening its Phase 1 to the public in 2014.

History

Background
The Mumbai Metropolitan Region Development Authority (MMRDA) first proposed a monorail in 2005. According to the MMRDA, the bus service operating in the city plied crowded and narrow areas at very slow speeds, thus offering no benefits to the commuters and adding to the traffic congestion. The MMRDA stated that the monorail would connect many parts of the city which were not connected by suburban rail system or the proposed metro rail system. The agency also stated that the monorail would be an efficient feeder transit to the metro and suburban rail systems offering efficient, safe, air-conditioned, comfortable and affordable public transport to commuters.

The construction of the first monorail line in Mumbai was mostly done from 2014. But nothing concrete came out of the notification for many years. The proposed line would connect Jacob Circle, Wadala and Mahul via Chembur, providing a feeder service to the existing Mumbai Suburban Railway. On 11 November 2008, Larsen and Toubro, along with the Malaysian partners Scomi Engineering Bhd, were awarded a  contract to build and operate the monorail until 2029.

Approximately  of line is planned to be built in phases between 2011 and 2031.

Construction
Then Maharashtra Chief Minister Ashok Chavan laid the foundation stone in a ceremony at the Acres Club, Chembur on 9 February 2009. The MMRDA commissioned the construction of the line in two phases. The first stretch linked Wadala on the outskirts of the island city with Chembur in the north-east, and the second connected Wadala with Jacob Circle in South Mumbai. The original deadline for the project was April 2011. The project was delayed by issues involving land, removal of encroachments, delays in getting permissions from the civic body and railways, and missed several deadlines for completion. The following months had all been announced as deadlines for the first phase - December 2010, May 2011, November 2011, May 2012, December 2012, June 2013, August 2013, 15 September 2013, October 2013 and December 2013. Deadlines announced for the second phase were May 2011, December 2011, May 2012, December 2012, December 2013, June 2014, December 2014 and March 2015. A Right to Information (RTI) request filed by RTI activist Anil Galgali revealed that the three-year delay in commissioning the monorail was primarily due to change of alignment of its route, which led to further cost escalation of the project.

A 108-meter test run was successfully conducted on 26 January 2010. A one-kilometer test run from Wadala to the Bhakti Park monorail station was undertaken on 18 February 2012. The first test run of the entire route was conducted by the MMRDA in November 2012.

In late December 2013, the MMRDA announced that it had submitted an application to Safety Certification Authority (Engineer) for the Chembur-Wadala stretch. The Safety Certification Authority goes through the documents, and physically inspects the corridor, and commercial operations can commence only after receiving its approval. The electrical systems were certified by the Electrical Inspector General. The contractor, the consortium of L&T and Scomi Engineering, had safety checks performed by an independent inspector. Official safety checks were performed by SMRT Corp of Singapore and R.C. Garg, retired Commissioner of Railway Safety. The final safety certificate was issued on 20 January. The safety certificate was then forwarded to the State Government, which issued a notification for commissioning the system. The notification contains norms for operation and maintenance of the system, which requires approval from the Chief Minister.

Opening

Line 1 was inaugurated by Maharashtra Chief Minister Prithviraj Chavan on 1 February 2014 at the Wadala Depot monorail station. After flagging off the first monorail train at 3:47pm, Chavan along with Deputy Chief Minister Ajit Pawar, and other officials rode the entire route, arriving at Chembur monorail station, 20 minutes later. The party then proceeded to Gandhi Maidan, 15th Road, Chembur (East), where the Chavan declared the monorail "open". The monorail was opened to the public the following day, with the first trip commencing from Wadala Depot at 7:08am. According to the MMRDA, it had very few passengers, as the gates were opened to the public only at 7:10am, when the train had already left. The first train from the opposite side, departed Chembur at 7:10am Services had been scheduled to operate until 3:00pm, however, station doors were closed by 2:30pm due to larger than expected ridership. Services were operated until 4:30pm, in order to provide a ride to everyone who had purchased a ticket. On opening day, 19,678 passengers travelled on the line. Sixty-six services were operated on the first day, netting a revenue of  through the sale of tickets and smart cards.

In the first week of operations (2–8 February 2014), the monorail transported 1,36,865 passengers in about 512 trips, earning a total revenue of 1,424,810. A total of 132,523 tokens and 1409 smart cards were also sold during the first week. According to the MMRDA, between 2 February and 1 March, a total of 458,871 commuters used the monorail, generating a total revenue 4,466,522. The monorail was closed for the first time on 17 March 2014 due to Holi.

Years of delays later Phase 2 was inaugurated by Maharashtra Chief Minister Devendra Fadnavis on 3 March 2019.

Plan 

In September 2011, the MMRDA said that did not have an immediate plan to begin construction of a second monorail line in the region. They clarified that although it did not mean that they are not interested in carrying out the project, it may not follow the currently planned schedule. An MMRDA official stated, "There is no point in going for new routes. As long as the first route is not commissioned and the results are not out, we would not commission any new routes. MMRDA feels the need for a monorail would arise after all the proposed metro rail routes were commissioned with the monorail serving as a feeder service."

In 2009, the MMRDA proposed the construction of an additional line on the Thane-Bhiwandi-Kalyan route. The route was proposed to have a station at every kilometer, cost  and be implemented on public-private partnership basis. It was further proposed to extend the corridor from Kalyan to Badlapur in the next phase. This project was shelved by the MMRDA in February 2014. The proposed corridor would have been 23.75 km long, and cost approximately 3,169 crore.

Further development of the monorail system is on hold, and questions have been raised as to whether the proposed monorail corridors will have sufficient capacity to meet Mumbai's requirements. The monorail may not be further extended by the MMRDA, as it may prove inadequate for Mumbai's population density. Foreign consultants have suggested a Metro or LRT system over a monorail for many Indian cities, e.g. Bangalore.

On 16 April 2015, The Economic Times reported that the State Government had decided to scrap all future monorail projects. The paper quoted an MMRDA official as saying, "There was a proposal for a Monorail from Thane to Kalyan and Bhiwandi, and also a line from Thane to Wadala. However, all those plans have been scrapped. There won't be any new Monorail projects."

Line 1

Line 1 connects Jacob Circle in South Mumbai with Chembur in eastern Mumbai. The 20.21 km line is fully elevated. Line 1 is owned and operated by the MMRDA. The monorail supplements service of the Mumbai Suburban Railway in some heavily populated areas. It suffered through delays due to shortage of functional monorail rakes. Phase 2 finally opened on 3 March 2019.

Infrastructure

Rolling stock

The monorail uses Scomi SUTRA systems built in Malaysia by Scomi Rail Bhd. The first car was shipped to India on 2 January 2010, marking the first time that rail cars manufactured by the company were exported overseas. Six trains currently operate in the first phase of the line. Ten more will be added in the second phase. Monorail trains are royal pink, apple green, and ice blue in colour, with black and white stripes.

Each monorail train consists of 4 coaches having a combined passenger capacity of 568. There are roughly 18 seated and 142 standing passengers at an average of seven persons per square metre per carriage (the end cars have a different capacity due to the driving position). The low number of seats was to ensure that the flow of people in and out of the coach was not hampered. Some sections of seats are reserved for pregnant women, the elderly and the differently-abled. Handrails and handgrips are installed in coaches, within easy reach of all standing passengers. A 4-coach monorail train has a total length of 44.8 metres, and each coach weighs 15 tonnes. All coaches are air-conditioned. There are 2 CCTV cameras installed in each coach.

Stations
The elevated stations can be reached via staircases and escalators. Each station will soon have a total of four escalators - two from ground level to concourse, and two more from concourse to the platform. Stations do not have any public toilets. MMRDA Commissioner UPS Madan said, "Nowhere in the world are there public toilets at monorail stations. The monorail journey is a short one, so the provision of public toilets was not made when the plan for stations was chalked out." All stations are equipped with baggage scanners, armed security guards at all stations entry points and CCTV cameras. Personnel of the Maharashtra State Security Corporation (MSSC) are deployed at the stations.

As part of the Station Area Traffic Improvement Scheme (SATIS), the MMRDA announced in April 2017 that it would move all bus and taxi stands to a distance of about 40–50 metres away from the monorail stations. The MMRDA believes that the current location of the stand just next the stations results in traffic congestion and restricts movement of pedestrians.

Depot and control centre
At Wadala, facilities were built on a 6.5-hectare site for administration and other operational needs. The operation control centre is equipped with surveillance video feeds from CCTVs and SCADA (supervisory control and data acquisition), which monitors the power supply. Vehicle and train washing specialist Smith Bros & Webb was awarded a contract to provide Britannia Train Wash plants for the Mumbai Monorail. Smith Bros & Webb designs and manufactures its own wash equipment under the brand name of Britannia.

Safety and security
Every station on the line is equipped with Door Frame Metal Detectors (DFMDs), X-ray baggage scanners, CCTV cameras and comply with NFPA (National Fire Protection Agency) 130 norms. Around 500 armed personnel and private guards are deployed at the 7 stations of the first phase. Officers in plainclothes are present inside trains, and real-time checks are conducted to curb trouble-makers, pickpockets and molesters. All stations have armed security guards at all entry points, and personnel of the Maharashtra State Security Corporation (MSSC) are deployed at the stations. All personnel manning the station premises are equipped with hand-held detectors. A bomb detection and disposal squad and a dog squad are also deployed at all stations.

The doors of coaches will not open when the train is in motion. Train operators will be given breath analyser tests when they report for duty. Violations will be met with disciplinary action, fines, and possible civil charges.

Operations

Fares
On 1 February 2014, at the time of inauguration the minimum fare on Line 1 was 5

Noise
According to studies conducted by the Mumbai Metropolitan Regional Development Authority (MMRDA) during the monorail trial run, it was found that the monorail produces between 65 – 85 decibels of noise, significantly lower than the 95 decibel noise level of a BEST Bus.

Speed

Capacity and frequency
The capacity of each four-car consist is 568 commuters under a 'crush load' and 852 passengers for a six-car consist.  There are roughly 20 seated and 124 standing passengers per carriage (the end cars have a different capacity due to the driving position).
The system has been designed for a 3-minute headway with operation from 05:00 to 24:00.  The projected peak-hour traffic is 7,400 passengers per hour per direction with 125,000 passengers per day; this is projected to rise to 8,300 and 300,000 respectively by 2013. In December 2017, the frequency is only 18,000 passengers per day.

The monorail initially operated from 7am and 3pm. This was later expanded to 7am to 7pm. The full operating hours will be from 5am to midnight, starting by February 2015. The MMRDA announced that Mumbai monorail from Wadala depot to Chembur will be running for 14 hours straight. The services would run from 6am to 8pm with a frequency of 15 minutes. Extended timing will also result in increase in number of monorail services per day from 64 to 112.

After Phase 2 opened, schedule was changed to 6am to 10pm with frequency of 45 minutes.

Future
There have been calls among several experts to extend the Mumbai Monorail Line 1 from its current southern endpoint of Jacob Circle to further west for till Babulnath Mandir Via Lala lajpat Rai College towards Gopalrao Deshmukh Marg and also then to extend from the current starting point of Chembur monorail station and extend  by 2 km north to  Ghatkopar Station via Mahul Road  thereby establishing a link between two currently unconnected Transportation hubs, thereby enhancing and adding on the current usability, reach and capacity of the system. Official planning has not begun. In 2021 Hyderabad based Medha Servo Drives Pvt Ltd got a contract to supply 10 rakes for Mumbai Monorail.First of 10 monorail rakes would be delivered in February 2023, which will increase the monorail's frequency to just 10 minutes.

Network map

See also
 Transport in Mumbai
 Mumbai Metro
 Mumbai Suburban Railway
 M-Indicator

References

Mumbai Monorail employees sent on unpaid leave; commuters continue to wait for its opening
http://www.dnaindia.com/mumbai/report-175-mumbai-monorail-staffers-sent-on-unpaid-leave-2625835

External links

 MMRDA Monorail Project

Monorails
 
Monorails in India
Rail transport in Mumbai
2014 establishments in Maharashtra
Railway lines opened in 2014